Rick Meyerowitz (born November 29, 1943) is an American artist, and author. He is best known for his work for National Lampoon magazine and its spin-offs, including his poster for the comedy film Animal House.

Early life
Meyerowitz was born in The Bronx, New York. He is the younger brother of photographer Joel Meyerowitz. He started drawing during his childhood and attended art school at Boston University.

National Lampoon magazine
Meyerowitz was a frequent contributor to National Lampoon magazine; memorable artwork of his included the "Mona Gorilla" (the Mona Lisa as a gorilla).

The film Animal House
Meyerowitz created the widely recognized theatrical release poster for the 1978 comedy movie Animal House.

Other work
Meyerowitz has worked as a commercial artist and as the author and artist of humorous books such as Return of the Nose Masks (1998; a book of punch-out masks to be worn on the nose) and Dodosaurs: The Dinosaurs That Didn't Make It (1983); he has also illustrated children's books (Rip Van Winkle, 2004, for example). Also created the cover illustration depicting the cast of M*A*S*H for the Nov. 2, 1974 issue of TV Guide.

Meyerowitz's collaborations with the artist Maira Kalman produced New Yorkistan, a popular cover for The New Yorker magazine, as well as editorial and humor pieces for The New York Times. Coasters which the two artists designed were for sale at the Museum of Modern Art.

Book
Meyerowitz put together a book about National Lampoon magazine's artists and writers, called Drunk Stoned Brilliant Dead: The Writers and Artists Who Made the National Lampoon Insanely Great. The book was published by Abrams in the fall of 2010.

Documentary film
Meyerowitz was interviewed and drew the theatrical release poster for the 2015 film National Lampoon: Drunk Stoned Brilliant Dead. The director Doug Tirola commented, "Before we shot the first frame of the movie, I had the idea and hope that Rick would do our poster. The Animal House poster, in my mind, is one of the best in the history of film."

References

External links
Meyerowitz's website

American illustrators
Living people
Boston University College of Fine Arts alumni
1943 births
National Lampoon people
Artists from the Bronx